Perry Colin Harris (11 January 1946 – 8 August 2021) was a New Zealand rugby union player. A prop, Harris represented Manawatu at a provincial level, and was called into the New Zealand national side, the All Blacks, as a replacement on their 1976 tour of South Africa. He played four matches for the All Blacks including one international.

Harris died in Papamoa on 8 August 2021, aged 75.

References

1946 births
2021 deaths
People from Feilding
New Zealand rugby union players
New Zealand international rugby union players
Manawatu rugby union players
Rugby union props
People educated at Feilding High School
Rugby union players from Manawatū-Whanganui